A social networking service is an online platform that people use to build social networks or social relationships with other people who share similar personal or career interests, activities, backgrounds or real-life connections.

This is a list of notable active social network services, excluding online dating services, that have Wikipedia articles. For defunct social networking websites, see List of defunct social networking services.

See also

 Comparison of free blog hosting services
 Comparison of microblogging and similar services
 List of social bookmarking websites
 List of social platforms with at least 100 million active users

References

 
Social networking